Languedoc is a settlement in Cape Winelands District Municipality in the Western Cape province of South Africa.

References

Populated places in the Stellenbosch Local Municipality